Michael Hansson may refer to:

 Michael Hansson (footballer) (born 1972), Swedish footballer
 Michael Hansson (judge) (1875–1944), Norwegian judge

See also
 Michael Hanson (born c. 1930s–1940s), Hong Kong press secretary
 Mikael Hansson (born 1968), Swedish footballer
 Michael Hansen (disambiguation)